"It's a Trip" is a song by Shakespears Sister, released in April 2010 as the fourth single from their fourth studio album Songs from the Red Room. A music video for the song was directed by Paul Boyd. An acoustic version of the song was also released exclusively through Shakespears Sister's official digital store.

Track listing 
CD single / Digital download
"It's a Trip" (Album Version) — 3:44
"It's a Trip" (Smalltown Boy Mix) — 5:53
"It's a Trip" (Bis Club Mix) — 7:29
"It's a Trip" (Punx Soundcheck Mix) — 6:11
"It's a Trip" (Apollo 404 Mix) — 3:40
"It's a Trip" (Lord And Master Early Dawn Mix) — 7:20
"It's a Trip" (Bis Radio Mix) — 3:49
"It's a Trip" (Stems Mix) — 3:58
"C U Tonight" (Demo) — 5:31
"Dedication" — 6:02
"Heroine" (Gully’s Ingestion Mix) — 3:33

Acoustic single
"It's a Trip" (Acoustic Version w/ Sam Stewart)
"You're Alone" (Acoustic Version w/ Sam Stewart)

References 

2010 songs
Music videos directed by Paul Boyd
Shakespears Sister songs
Songs written by Siobhan Fahey
Songs written by Marco Pirroni